Dendropoma exsertum is a species of sea snail, a marine gastropod mollusk in the family Vermetidae, the worm snails or worm shells.

Distribution
Ranges from North Carolina to Barbados, including in the Gulf of Mexico.

Description 
The maximum recorded shell length is 11 mm.

Habitat 
Minimum recorded depth is 57 m. Maximum recorded depth is 1832 m.

References

External links

Vermetidae
Gastropods described in 1881